Yrjö Aunus Olavi Neuvo (born 21 July 1943) is a Finnish engineer and professor emeritus.

In 1976 Neuvo was appointed professor of electronics (1976–1992) at Tampere University of Technology. Under his leadership, postgraduate education from digital signal processing (DSP) began immediately at Tampere University of Technology. Graduate studies in digital signal processing continued for two years until 1978.

Publications

Monographs
 The Application of Digital Techniques to a VOR Signal Generator. Doctoral thesis, Cornell University, 1974.
 Neuvo, Yrjö: Rekisteröintilaitteiston suunnittelu radiotieteellistä mittausjärjestelmää varten (Design of recording equipment for a radio science measurement system). TKK 1968. 
 Neuvo, Yrjö: Digitaalinen VOR-pientaajuusgeneraattori [Digital VOR low frequency generator]. TKK 1971.
 Neuvo, Yrjö; Ojala, L.; Reimavuo, J.: The optimal generation of sine waveforms using first-order hold reconstruction techniques. TKK 1971.
 Neuvo, Yrjö: Digital VOR audio generator, 19 pages, TKK 1972.
 Neuvo, Yrjö: Analysis and digital realization of Pseudo Random Gaussian and impulsive noise source. TKK 1973. .
 Neuvo, Yrjö: The application of digital signal prosessing in the design of a digital noise source. TKK 1974. .

Articles 
 Neuvo, Yrjö: The Application of Digital Techniques to a VOR Signal Generator. IEEE Transactions on Aerospace and Electronic Systems, vol. AES-9, no. 1, pp. 38–42, 1973. .
 Neuvo, Yrjö; Ku, Walter: Analysis and Digital Realization of a Pseudorandom Gaussian and Impulsive Noise Source. IEEE Transactions on Communications, 1975: 23:9:849–858. .

Awards and honors 
 IEEE Fellow 1989, Life Fellow 2009

References

External links 
 
 

1943 births
Scientists from Turku
Fellow Members of the IEEE
Academic staff of the University of Tampere
Living people
Cornell University alumni